Alain Bouchet (1927 – 15 July 1975) was a French equestrian. He competed in two events at the 1956 Summer Olympics.

References

External links
 

1927 births
1975 deaths
French male equestrians
Olympic equestrians of France
Equestrians at the 1956 Summer Olympics
Place of birth missing